Nakonde District is a district of Zambia, located in Muchinga Province. The capital lies at Nakonde. As of the 2000 Zambian Census, the district had a population of 75,135 people.

References

Districts of Muchinga Province